The Eberswalde University for Sustainable Development (literally University for Sustainable Development; abbreviated in German as HNE Eberswalde or HNEE) is a Fachhochschule in Eberswalde, Germany. It was founded 1830 as a higher institute (Höhere Forstlehranstalt) of forestry. It was re-established in its present form as a Fachhochschule, or university of applied sciences, in 1992, with a range of courses and content geared towards sustainable development. In 2010 it was renamed the Entwicklung Eberswalde (FH). Since December 1997 its president has been Wilhelm-Günther Vahrson.

Notable person 
Julius Lothar Meyer

See also 
 List of historic schools of forestry

External links
Official site
http://www.utopia.de/magazin/ergebnis-deutschlands-gruenste-hochschulen-ranking

Universities of Applied Sciences in Germany
Universities and colleges in Brandenburg
 
1830 establishments in Germany
Educational institutions established in 1830